Mulshi taluka is a taluka in Maval subdivision of Pune district of state of Maharashtra in India. Mulshi consisted of Pune Metropolitan Region & Villages.

Pune Metropolitan Region & Villages in Mulshi taluka

Adgaon (Mulshi)	
Admal	
Akole (Mulshi)	
Amarale Wadi
Ambadwet	
Ambarwet	
Ambavane	
Ambegaon (Mulshi)	
Andeshe	
Andgaon	
Andhale	
Asade	
Barpe Bk.	
Bavadhan BK
Belawade (Pune Metropolitan Region)
Bembatmal	
Bhadas Bk.	
Bhalgudi	
Bhambarde	
Bhare	
Bharekarwadi	
Bhegadewadi	
Bhode
Bhoini
Bhoirwadi (Pune Metropolitan Region)
Bhugaon
Bhukum
Botarwadi
Chale (Mulshi)
Chande (Mulshi)
Chandivali (Mulshi)
Chikhalgaon
Chikhali Bk.
Chinchwad
Dakhane
Darawali
Dasave
Dattawadi
Dattwadi
Davaje
Devghar
Dhadawali
Dhamanohol
Disali
Dongargaon (Mulshi)
Ekole
Gadale
Gavadewadi
Ghotavade
Ghutake
Godambewadi
Hinjawadi (Pune Metropolitan Region)
Hadashi
Hotale
Hulavalewadi
Jambe (Mulshi)
Jamgaon (Mulshi)
Jatede
Jawal (Mulshi)
Kalamshet
Karmoli
Kasar Amboli
Kasarsai
Kashig
Katar Khadak
Katavadi
Kemasewadi
Khamboli
Kharavade
Khechare
Khubawali
Kolavade
Kolawali
Koloshi (Mulshi)
Kolwan
Kondhawale
Kondhur
Kule (Mulshi)
Kumbheri
Lavale
Lavharde
Maded
Mahalunge
Majgaon (Mulshi)
Male (Mulshi)
Malegaon (Mulshi)
Man (Mulshi)
Maranewadi
Marunji
Materewadi (Mulshi)
Morewadi
Mose Kh.
Mugaon
Mugavade
Mukaiwadi
Mulkhed
Mulshi Kh.
Muthe
Maan, Pune (Pune Metropolitan Region)
Nande
Nandgaon
Nandivali
Nanegaon (Mulshi)
Nere (Mulshi)
Nive (Mulshi)
Padalghar
Padalgharwadi
Palase (Mulshi)
Patharshet
Paud
Peth Shahapur
Pimpaloli
Pimpri
Pomgaon
Punawale
Ravade
Rihe
Saiv Kh
Sakhari (Mulshi)
Saltar
Sambhave
Satesai
Savargaon
Share
Shedani
Shileshwar
Shindewadi
Shirvali
Sus
Tail Baila
Tamhini Bk
Tata Talav
Tav
Temghar
Uravade
Vadgaon
Valane
Vandre (Mulshi)
Vede
Vegre (Mulshi)
Visakhar
Vitthalwadi (Mulshi)
Wadavali (Mulshi)
Wajale
Walen
Warak (Mulshi)
Watunde
Wakad
Tathawade

See also
 Talukas in Pune district

References

Talukas in Pune district